Anthony Carl Marshall (born 20 March 1991) is an American basketball player, who last played for New Heroes Den Bosch of the Dutch Basketball League (DBL). Standing at 1.90 m (6 ft 3 in), Marshall usually plays as point guard.

College career
Marshall played for UNLV, where he became the first Runnin' Rebel in 20 years to play in four straight NCAA Tournaments. As a senior, he averaged 10.4 points and 4.1 rebounds per game with a 2.1 assist-to-turnover ratio. He was a second-team All-Mountain West selection as a senior.

Professional career
On 11 August 2017, Marshall signed with New Heroes Den Bosch of the Dutch Basketball League (DBL). On 4 March 2018, Marshall suffered from a torn Achilles tendon which caused him to miss the remainder of the 2017–18 season.

References

External links
UNLV Runnin’ Rebels bio

1991 births
Living people
American expatriate basketball people in Belgium
American expatriate basketball people in Israel
American expatriate basketball people in the Netherlands
American expatriate basketball people in Ukraine
Basketball players from Louisiana
Heroes Den Bosch players
Hapoel Tel Aviv B.C. players
Leuven Bears players
Point guards
UNLV Runnin' Rebels basketball players
American men's basketball players